Alan Graham Judge (born 14 May 1960) is a retired professional footballer, who is the seventh oldest player to play in the Football League. He played as a goalkeeper.

During his career he played for various clubs at all tiers of the League. He was part of the Oxford United team that won the Milk Cup in 1986. He also briefly served as a backup goalkeeper for Chelsea in the European Cup Winners' Cup.

Often referred to as The Judge, after retiring from the professional game he worked as a driving instructor and goalkeeping coach at several clubs including Swindon and Oxford, occasionally acting as emergency goalkeeping cover. In 2001, he organised a re-run of the 1986 Milk Cup Final against QPR, for charity.

On 18 March 2003, at the age of 42, he played his first Football League match since leaving Hereford United in 1994. He helped Oxford to a 1–1 draw with Cambridge United, making a vital save in stoppage time. During the 2003–04 season he also made several appearances for Didcot Town. He made a second appearance for Oxford on 6 November 2004, at the age of 44 years and 176 days. This made him the seventh oldest footballer ever to have appeared in the Football League or Premier League.

References

Living people
1960 births
Luton Town F.C. players
Reading F.C. players
Banbury United F.C. players
Lincoln City F.C. players
Cardiff City F.C. players
Oxford United F.C. players
Hereford United F.C. players
Swindon Town F.C. players
Didcot Town F.C. players
Association football goalkeepers
English footballers